Paulo Exequiel Dybala (born 15 November 1993) is an Argentine professional footballer who plays as a forward for Serie A club Roma and the Argentina national team.

Nicknamed "La Joya" ("The Jewel"), Dybala began his senior club career in 2011 playing for Instituto de Córdoba, before signing for Palermo in 2012, at age 18, where he won a Serie B title. In 2015, Dybala signed for Juventus and won five league titles and four Coppas Italia. He was also voted Serie A Most Valuable Player once, was also included in the Serie A Team of the Year four times, and ranks as Juventus' ninth-highest all-time goalscorer. In 2022, he joined Roma.

Dybala made his senior international debut for Argentina in 2015 at age 21, and has since earned over 30 caps, including appearing at the 2018 FIFA World Cup, 2019 Copa América and 2022 World Cup, winning the latter tournament.

Early life
Dybala was born in Laguna Larga, Córdoba, Argentina. His grandfather, Bolesław Dybała, was from the village of Kraśniów in Poland; he fled from his country of birth to Argentina during World War II. Some of his grandfather's family moved to Canada. Dybala's family also has partial Italian origins through his maternal great-grandmother, who was from the Province of Naples.

Club career

Instituto de Córdoba
Nicknamed "La Joya" or "El pibe de la pensión", Dybala made his professional debut in the Primera B Nacional (Argentine second division) with his hometown club Instituto Atlético Central Córdoba at age 17. In total, he played 40 matches with the club, scoring 17 goals. He was the youngest to score a goal, beating the record of Mario Kempes. Dybala was also the first to play 38 consecutive matches in a professional league in the country (again edging Kempes), and was also the first to score two hat-tricks in a season. Dybala also scored in six consecutive games, surpassing the previous record of four matches.

Palermo

On 29 April 2012, U.S. Città di Palermo president Maurizio Zamparini announced the signing of Dybala stating, "We have got Paulo Dybala – the new Sergio Agüero." Later the same day, however, Instituto's general secretary José Teaux stated that the man who had completed the negotiations with Palermo did not have the mandate to sell Dybala. Nonetheless, on 20 July 2012 Palermo released a press announcement confirming the signing of Dybala, who signed a four-year deal with the Sicilian club. According to the financial filing of the club, the transfer fee was €8.64 million.

Dybala made his debut for the club in a Serie A match against Lazio. He scored his first and second goal in Italy on 11 November 2012 when Palermo defeated Sampdoria at home, 2–0. Dybala had his breakthrough season in the 2014–15 Serie A where he scored ten goals in the first half of the season, forming a successful striking partnership with fellow Argentine–Italian Franco Vázquez and being linked with several top European clubs. He finished the season with 13 goals and 10 assists, which made him one of the top assist providers in the league.

Juventus

2015–2018: Transfer and three domestic doubles
On 4 June 2015, Juventus announced the signing of Dybala on a five-year deal for a fee of €32 million (plus €8 million in add-ons). He was assigned the number 21 shirt, previously worn by Andrea Pirlo, who left the club that summer. On 8 August, he came on as a 61st-minute substitute for Kingsley Coman against Lazio in the 2015 Supercoppa Italiana. He scored the second goal in the 73rd minute in a 2–0 win in Shanghai. On 30 August 2015, Dybala scored his first league goal for the club in the 87th minute in a 2–1 defeat to Roma. In his first 16 appearances of the season, Dybala managed six goals and two assists in all competitions, with a ratio of a goal every 151 minutes, which was superior to Carlos Tevez's and Alessandro Del Piero's goalscoring ratios in their debut seasons with Juventus. In the club's history, only Roberto Baggio maintained a superior goalscoring record in the opening games of his debut season.

Dybala scored his first career Coppa Italia goal in a 4–0 win over cross-city rivals Torino on 16 December. On 23 February 2016, Dybala scored his first UEFA Champions League goal in a 2–2 home draw to Bayern Munich in Juventus' first round of 16 leg. On 15 March, it was announced Dybala would miss the second round of 16 leg of the Champions League against Bayern on 16 March due to an edema overload of his left soleus muscle. He returned to action four days later in a 4–1 away win over Torino, but was substituted after sustaining yet another injury. On 21 April, Dybala scored two goals in a 3–0 home win over Lazio, which took his league tally to 16 goals in 31 appearances and also saw him score his 20th goal of the season in all competitions in the process. He finished the season as Juventus' top scorer with 23 goals in all competitions and 19 goals in Serie A, as the club celebrated their Serie A title victory.

Following the departure of Paul Pogba to Manchester United in the summer of 2016, Dybala was offered the number 10 jersey by Juventus, although he turned it down, preferring to keep the number 21 jersey that he had worn during his previous season. Following manager Massimiliano Allegri's switch to a 4–2–3–1 formation, the 2016–17 season saw Dybala operate in a deeper playmaking role behind the club's new signing Gonzalo Higuaín, which saw a decrease in his goalscoring output as he took on increasing defensive and creative duties. After struggling to score at the beginning of the season, Dybala scored his first goal of the 2016–17 campaign on 27 September, in a 4–0 away win over Dinamo Zagreb in the Champions League. He scored his first Serie A goal of the season that weekend, on 2 October, in a 3–0 away win over Empoli.

On 11 April, Dybala scored two goals in Juventus's first-leg Champions League quarter-final fixture against Barcelona, helping the club to a 3–0 home victory. On 13 April 2017, Dybala renewed his contract with Juventus until 2022. On 3 June, Dybala started in the 2017 Champions League Final, but Juventus were defeated 4–1 by defending champions Real Madrid, missing out on the treble.

On 4 August 2017, Dybala was named one of the three finalists for the Forward of the 2016–17 UEFA Champions League season award. On 9 August, Dybala was confirmed to wear the number 10 shirt for Juventus. On 13 August he scored two goals in a 3–2 defeat to Lazio in the 2017 Supercoppa Italiana. On 15 August, Dybala placed sixth in the 2017 UEFA Best Player of the Year Award. On 26 August, Dybala scored his first hat-trick in Serie A in a 4–2 away win over Genoa. He repeated the feat on 17 September, in his 100th appearance for Juventus, scoring all three goals, including one free-kick, in the club's 3–1 away win over Sassuolo, marking his second hat-trick in Serie A. On 11 March 2018, Dybala scored a brace in a 2–0 home win over Udinese in Serie A; his first goal of the match was also his 100th career goal. He made his 150th appearance in Serie A in a 0–0 away draw against S.P.A.L., on 17 March.

2018–2022: Struggles and return to form

On 1 September 2018, Dybala made his 100th Serie A appearance for Juventus, coming on as a late second-half substitute in a 2–1 away win over Parma. On 2 October, Dybala scored a hat-trick in a 3–0 home win over Young Boys in the Champions League. In Juventus's following Champions League group match on 23 October, Dybala scored the only goal of the game in a 1–0 away win over Manchester United. With the arrival of Cristiano Ronaldo, Dybala was often deployed out of position in a deeper role by manager Allegri during the 2018–19 season; as a result of this positional switch, as well as struggles with injuries, and difficulties with his manager, Dybala suffered a loss of form, and his goalscoring output decreased significantly, as he managed to score only five goals in 30 league matches, and 10 goals across 42 appearances in all competitions. However, Juventus managed to retain the Serie A title.

Following a disappointing 2018–19 campaign, Dybala was initially linked with moves to Premier League sides Manchester United and Tottenham, although he ultimately remained with Juventus for the 2019–20 season. Although he was initially not expected to start under the club's new manager Maurizio Sarri, he eventually broke into the first XI and scored his first goal of the season on 6 October 2019, in a 2–1 away win over rivals Inter, to help his side overtake the Nerazzurri at the top of the Serie A table. On 7 December, he made his 200th appearance for Juventus in a 3–1 away defeat to Lazio in Serie A.

In the 2020 Coppa Italia Final against Napoli on 17 June, following a 0–0 draw after regulation time, Dybala missed Juventus's first spot-kick in the resulting shoot-out, with his shot being saved by Alex Meret; Napoli ultimately won the match 4–2 on penalties. At the end of the season, Dybala was awarded the Serie A MVP award for the 2019–20 season. He finished the campaign with 11 goals and 6 assists, helping Juventus win their 9th consecutive title.

On 20 October 2020, Dybala made his first appearance of the new season in Juventus's opening Champions League game, coming on as a second–half substitute in a 2–0 away win over Dynamo Kyiv. Dybala scored his first goal of the season on 4 November against Ferencváros in a 4–1 win during a Champions League group stage match. On 21 March 2022, Juventus chief executive officer Maurizio Arrivabene announced that the club had decided not to renew Dybala's contract which would expire in the summer, citing changes in the club's project following the arrival of striker Dušan Vlahović earlier that year. After being sidelined for months due to injury, Dybala made his return on 7 April 2021, scoring the winning goal of a 2–1 home win over Napoli. On 12 May, he scored a goal in a 3–1 away win over Sassuolo, to reach his 100th goal for Juventus in all competitions, hence he became the first non-European player in doing so. On 15 May 2022, Dybala announced on social media that he would leave Juventus at the end of the season. Dybala played his final home match for Juventus on 16 May 2022 against Lazio, being substituted by Martin Palumbo in the 78th minute, for which he received a standing ovation.

Roma 
On 20 July 2022, Dybala signed for Roma on a three-year contract that runs until 30 June 2025. On 14 August, he made his debut for the club in a 1–0 away win against Salernitana in the Serie A.

International career

Due to his family heritage, Dybala was eligible to play for Poland and Italy, but expressly stated that he feels Argentine and had always dreamed of playing for Argentina. Dybala stated "I feel 100 percent Argentinian, I wouldn't be happy in a national team that didn't feel like mine, to hear an anthem that isn't my own, in colours that don't belong to me".

Dybala was called by the Argentina under-17 team to participate in the XVI Pan American Games, but ultimately did not take part in the competition. On 19 July 2012, he received his first call-up for the under-20 team, but declined the invitation.

On 22 September 2015, Dybala was called for the first time for the Argentina senior team by manager Gerardo Martino, but his first appearance was on 13 October 2015, coming off the bench to replace Carlos Tevez in the 75th minute during a 2018 FIFA World Cup qualifying match against Paraguay. In May 2016, he was omitted from Argentina's 23-man squad for the Copa América Centenario. Although Juventus insisted that they would not release Dybala for the 2016 Summer Olympics in Rio de Janeiro, he was included in Martino's 35-man preliminary under-23 squad for the tournament on 24 May; he was not included in the final squad for the tournament, however.

On 1 September 2016, Dybala was sent off in the first half of a 1–0 home win over Uruguay in a 2018 World Cup qualifier for a second bookable offence. On 13 June 2017, he set up a goal for Joaquín Correa in a 6–0 away friendly win over Singapore.

In May 2018, Dybala was named in Argentina's preliminary 35-man squad for the 2018 FIFA World Cup in Russia; later that month, he was included in Jorge Sampaoli's final 23-man squad for the tournament. He made his World Cup debut in Argentina's second group match on 21 June, coming on as a second-half substitute for Enzo Pérez in the 68th minute of an eventual 3–0 defeat to Croatia. This was his only appearance in the tournament, as Argentina were eliminated in the round of 16 on 30 June, following a 4–3 defeat to France.

Later that year, he scored his first senior international goal on 20 November, in a 2–0 friendly home win over Mexico.

In May 2019, Dybala was included in Argentina manager Lionel Scaloni's preliminary 40-man squad for the 2019 Copa América. Later that month, he was included in the final 23-man squad for the tournament. In Argentina's final group match against Qatar on 23 June, Dybala assisted Agüero's goal in a 2–0 win after coming off the bench for Lautaro Martínez, which enabled them to advance to the knock-out stages of the competition. In the third-place match against Chile on 6 July, Dybala made his first start of the tournament, and scored Argentina's second goal in an eventual 2–1 win, to help his team capture the bronze medal.

On 1 June 2022, Dybala scored Argentina's final goal in a 3–0 win over reigning European Champions Italy at Wembley Stadium in the 2022 Finalissima.

He was included in the final 26-man squad for the 2022 FIFA World Cup by Lionel Scaloni. On 13 December, he made his first appearance against Croatia, replacing Julián Álvarez, in a 3–0 semi-final victory. Five days later, in the final, he substituted Nicolás Tagliafico right before the penalty shoot-out as the match ended 3–3 at extra-time. He saved his team from a last minute goal, and scored the second penalty in the shoot-out as his team eventually defeated France 4–2 to win the World Cup.

Style of play
A quick, creative, elegant, and agile player, with excellent technical ability and a low centre of gravity, Dybala is known for his powerful and accurate shots from outside the box, dribbling skills, balance, and close control in limited spaces, as well as his ability to beat opponents in one on one situations and protect or hold up the ball for teammates with his back to goal. Due to his speed on the ball, positioning, intelligent movement, and ball skills, he excels during counter-attacks and at beating the offside trap when making attacking runs. A hardworking player, he is also known for his stamina and defensive contribution off the ball. Dybala is capable both of creating chances for teammates, as well as scoring goals himself, due to his vision, passing, link-up play, and ability to drop deep and play off other players, as well as his powerful and accurate ball-striking ability from both inside and outside the area. Despite his diminutive stature, Dybala is also effective at scoring with his head, due to his acceleration over short distances, and his ability to anticipate defenders inside the box.

A versatile forward, he is capable of playing in any offensive position: he started out playing as a left winger for Instituto in Argentina towards the beginning of his career, but since moving to Italy he has been deployed in a variety of attacking roles, including as a main striker, as a centre-forward, as a second striker, as an attacking midfielder, in a free role as a wide playmaker, as a right-sided inside forward, as a false attacking midfielder, as a false 9, or even as an inverted winger on the right flank, where he is able to cut into the centre and curl shots on goal with his stronger left foot. He has also been used in a free attacking role on occasion, in which he is given licence to roam about the final third of the pitch, and either drop into the middle, or switch between the flanks, due to his ability to create from the left or cut inside and score from the right. Because of his work-rate and involvement in the build-up of his team's attacking plays, in addition to his goalscoring ability, his former manager at Juventus Massimiliano Allegri even deployed Dybala as an offensive-minded central midfielder on occasion (known as a "mezzala", in Italian), and described him as a "box-to-box player" ("tuttocampista", in Italian) in 2018. He has also operated in a deeper playmaking role on occasion. Dybala is also accurate from both free kicks and penalties. His playing style has drawn comparisons with compatriots Sergio Agüero, Javier Pastore, Carlos Tevez, Omar Sívori, Diego Maradona, and Lionel Messi, as well as former Italian forwards Vincenzo Montella, Alessandro Del Piero, and Roberto Baggio; the latter described Dybala as the number 10 of the future in 2017. Widely considered to be a highly talented prospect in world football, in 2014, Don Balón named him one of the 100 most promising young players in the world born after 1993. Despite his talent, however, his mentality, consistency, and leadership qualities have come into question at times in the media. Moreover, he has also struggled with injuries throughout his career.

After scoring a goal, Dybala is known for using his signature "mask" celebration; regarding the gesture, he commented: "My mask gesture isn't so much a goal celebration but rather a message. It's an ideal mask, which gladiators wore to fight. In Doha against Milan, after we lost Supercoppa, the idea of this celebration was born."

Personal life
Dybala obtained Italian citizenship on 13 August 2012, in order to facilitate his move to Palermo, and circumvent FIGC regulations that permit only a maximum of two non-EU players in any Serie A team. Dybala initially attempted to obtain Polish citizenship through ancestry from his grandfather, but the bureaucracy proved too complex.

Dybala has several tattoos on his body: two stripes on his left arm, an Arabic tattoo as well as a crowned football on his leg.

Career statistics

Club

International

Scores and results list Argentina's goal tally first, score column indicates score after each Dybala goal.

Honours
Palermo
 Serie B: 2013–14

Juventus
 Serie A: 2015–16, 2016–17, 2017–18, 2018–19, 2019–20
 Coppa Italia: 2015–16, 2016–17, 2017–18, 2020–21
 Supercoppa Italiana: 2015, 2018, 2020

Argentina
 FIFA World Cup: 2022
 CONMEBOL–UEFA Cup of Champions: 2022

Individual
 Serie A Team of the Year: 2015–16, 2016–17, 2017–18, 2019–20
 Serie A Player of the Month: July 2020
 Serie A Most Valuable Player: 2019–20
 ESM Team of the Year: 2016–17
 Coppa Italia top goalscorer: 2016–17
 Serie A top assist provider: 2014–15

Records
 Supercoppa Italiana all-time top scorer: 4 goals

References

External links

 Profile at the A.S. Roma website
 
 
 
 
 
 
 

1993 births
Living people
People of Campanian descent
Argentine people of Polish descent
Argentine people of Italian descent
Sportspeople from Córdoba Province, Argentina
Argentine footballers
Association football forwards
Instituto footballers
Palermo F.C. players
Juventus F.C. players
A.S. Roma players
Primera Nacional players
Serie A players
Serie B players
Argentina international footballers
2018 FIFA World Cup players
2019 Copa América players
2022 FIFA World Cup players
FIFA World Cup-winning players
Argentine expatriate footballers
Argentine expatriate sportspeople in Italy
Expatriate footballers in Italy
Citizens of Italy through descent